Stewartia monadelpha, known as tall stewartia or orangebark stewartia, is a deciduous shrub or multi-stemmed tree native to the temperate rainforests of Japan. Stewartia is a genus of flowering plants in the family Theaceae. The genus name Stewartia is in honor of 16th century Scottish botanist, John Stuart.

Distribution and habitat
Tall stewartia is endemic to Japan and primarily grows in cool, montane temperate rainforest zones; specifically, south-central Honshu, Kyushu and Shikoku islands. It is also cultivated in other countries as an ornamental plant.

Description
Its appearance varies from a sturdy shrub too a small tree with orange or cinnamon-brown colored bark. It typically grows to a height of  but has been known to reach . As the plant matures its form changes from a pyramidal crown to become more open with horizontal branches reaching outwards.

Ecology
This plant grows best in partial shade, but having an excellent heat tolerance, is able to grow well in full sunlight. In terms of soil, tall stewartia can tolerate well-drained clay, loam, sandy, and acidic soils.

References

monadelpha
Flora of Japan
Plants described in 1841